Marsa Al Arab  is a new development to create two islands off the coast of Dubai, United Arab Emirates which will add 2.2km of beachfront to the city.

Construction 

Dubai Holding announced the plan to construct an island either side of the Burj Al Arab hotel starting in June 2017, with completion scheduled for 2020 at a cost of $1.72billion (AED6.3billion).

Family Resort Island - to the north east will be  and will contain a marine park and the Wild Wadi Waterpark, a 1,700-seat theatre which will become the home to a Cirque du Soleil and 300 apartments.

A private Island of  - to the south west will be exclusive and contain 140 luxury apartments, a marina and a boutique hotel.

A convention centre, restaurants, three additional hotels which will add 2,400 rooms to the city facilities and shopping outlets are included in the project.

External links  
 Marsa Al Arab video
 Dubai Holdings

References

Artificial islands of Dubai